M200 may stand for:

 CheyTac Intervention, an American bolt-action sniper rifle manufactured by Randy Kobzeff 
 M-200 (Michigan highway), a state highway that served as a spur route from US 41 into Stephenson in Menominee County
 Saber M200, a Brazilian Radar unit by Saber Radar
 Mauboussin M.200, a French racing monoplane
 CVT M-200, a two-seat glider designed and built in Italy 
 Soviet submarine M-200, a short-range, diesel attack submarine of the Soviet Navy
 Volociximab, aka M200, a chimeric monoclonal antibody 
 Canon EOS M200, an mirrorless camera from Canon
 HKL Class M200, a metro train of Helsinki Metro